This is a compendium of schools in Poland by voivodeship with original source data. The complete government summary is available at the List of Schools in Poland per each Voivodeship (Wykaz szkół i placówek oświatowych według województw) provided by the Education Digital Centre, Poland (Centrum Informatyczne Edukacji, CIE); retrievable in both Zip and Excel formats, with each school's full name and street address listed. The official data include state subsidized Grade 0 preschools prior to the commencement of compulsory education.

Greater Poland Voivodeship
Featured are: 5,659 schools categorized by agglomeration and type, with CIE codes for classroom sizes and gminas. Digital source file for the Greater Poland Voivodeship (woj. wielkopolskie) official list of schools is available at: 
SIO:  wielkopolskie.zip Retrieved 26 November 2014.  
See also Wikipedia articles about selected locations which include:
Adam Mickiewicz High School in Poznań
St. John Cantius High School, Poznań, Poland
Saint Mary Magdalene High School in Poznań

Kuyavian-Pomeranian Voivodeship
Featured are: 3,316 schools categorized by agglomeration and type, with CIE codes for classroom sizes and gminas. Digital source file for the Kuyavian-Pomeranian Voivodeship (woj. kujawsko-pomorskie) official list of schools is: 
SIO:  kujawsko-pomorskie.zip Retrieved 26 November 2014.  
See also Wikipedia articles about selected locations which include: 
High School No. 1 in Bydgoszcz

Lesser Poland Voivodeship
Listed are: 6,015 schools categorized by agglomeration and type, with CIE codes for classroom sizes and gminas. Digital source file for the Lesser Poland Voivodeship (woj. małopolskie) official list of schools is:
SIO:  malopolskie.zip Retrieved 26 November 2014.  
See also Wikipedia articles about selected locations which include: 
Bartłomiej Nowodworski High School
British International School of Cracow
International School of Krakow
Jan III Sobieski High School, Kraków
John Paul II High School in Tarnów

Lower Silesian Voivodeship
Featured are: 4,283 schools categorized by agglomeration and type, with CIE codes for classroom sizes and gminas. Digital source file for the Lower Silesian Voivodeship (woj. dolnośląskie) official list of schools is:
SIO:  dolnoslaskie.zip Retrieved 26 November 2014.  
See also Wikipedia articles about selected locations which include: 
BISC Wrocław

Lublin Voivodeship
Listed are: 3,881 schools. Digital source file for the Lublin Voivodeship (woj. lubelskie) official list of schools is available at: 
SIO:  lubelskie.zip Retrieved 26 November 2014.

Lubusz Voivodeship
Listed are: 1,539 schools. Digital source file for the Lubusz Voivodeship (woj. lubuskie) official list of schools is available at: 
SIO:  lubuskie.zip Retrieved 26 November 2014.

Łódź Voivodeship
Listed are: 3,811 schools. Digital source file for the Łódź Voivodeship (woj. łódzkie) official list of schools is:
SIO:  lodzkie.zip Retrieved 26 November 2014. 
See also Wikipedia articles about selected locations which include: 
Maria Konopnicka Special Education School Complex

Masovian Voivodeship
Listed are: 8,185 schools. Note that the official register of schools in the city of Warsaw (the Masovian Voivodeship's as well as Poland's capital), includes 1,084 schools alone. Digital source file for the Masovian Voivodeship (woj. mazowieckie) official list of schools is:
SIO:  mazowieckie.zip Retrieved 26 November 2014. 
See also Wikipedia articles about selected locations which include: 
Lauder – Morasha School
Marshal Stanisław Małachowski High School, Płock
Stefan Batory Gymnasium and Lyceum (Warsaw, Poland)
Warsaw School of Business and Finance (Warsaw, Poland)
International schools:
American School of Warsaw
The British School, Warsaw
International American School of Warsaw
 The Japanese School in Warsaw
 Willy-Brandt-Schule
 Lycée Français de Varsovie

Opole Voivodeship
Listed are: 1,799 schools. Digital source file for the Opole Voivodeship (woj. opolskie) official list of schools is available at: 
SIO:  opolskie.zip Retrieved 26 November 2014.

Podkarpackie Voivodeship
Listed are: 4,051 schools categorized by type, and name of agglomeration, with CIE codes for classroom sizes and gminas. Digital source file for the Podkarpackie Voivodeship (woj. podkarpackie) official list of schools is:
SIO:  podkarpackie.zip Retrieved 26 November 2014. 
See also Wikipedia articles about selected locations which include: 
Konarski Secondary School in Rzeszów
Liceum Ogolnoksztalcace im. K.E.N.

Lui
SIO:  podlaskie.zip ĺRetrieved 26 November 2014.  
See also Wikipedia articles about selected locations which include: 
VI High School – King Sigismund Augustus
Luigi mito

Pomeranian Voivodeship
Listed are: 3,787 schools categorized by type, and name of agglomeration, with CIE codes for classroom sizes and gminas. Digital source file for the Pomeranian Voivodeship (woj. pomorskie) official list of schools is:
SIO:  pomorskie.zip Retrieved 26 November 2014.  
See also Wikipedia articles about selected locations which include: 
Gimnazjum nr 24 k. III High School
School Group no. 2 in Pruszcz Gdański

Silesian Voivodeship
Listed are: 7,014 schools categorized by type, and name of agglomeration, with CIE codes for classroom sizes and gminas. Digital source file for the Silesian Voivodeship (woj. śląskie) official list of schools is:
SIO:  slaskie.zip Retrieved 26 November 2014.  
See also Wikipedia articles about selected locations which include: 
Complex of Silesian International Schools
Zespół Szkół Ogólnokształcących nr 10 in Gliwice

Świętokrzyskie Voivodeship
Listed are: 2,277 schools categorized by type, and name of agglomeration, with CIE codes for classroom sizes and gminas. Digital source file for the Świętokrzyskie Voivodeship (woj. świętokrzyskie) official list of schools is:
SIO:  swietokrzyskie.zip Retrieved 26 November 2014.  
See also Wikipedia articles about selected locations which include: 
Collegium Gostomianum

Warmian-Masurian Voivodeship
Listed are: 2,495 schools categorized by type, and name of agglomeration, with CIE codes for classroom sizes and gminas. Digital source file for the Warmian-Masurian Voivodeship (woj. warmińsko-mazurskie) official list of schools is available at: 
SIO:  warminsko-mazurskie.zip Retrieved 26 November 2014.

West Pomeranian Voivodeship
Listed are: 2,691 schools categorized by type, and name of agglomeration, with CIE codes for classroom sizes and gminas. Digital source file for the West Pomeranian Voivodeship (woj. zachodniopomorskie) official list of schools is available at: 
SIO:  zachodniopomorskie.zip Retrieved 26 November 2014.

See also

Education in Poland
List of universities in Poland
List of law schools in Poland

Notes and references

 
Poland
Poland
Schools
Schools
Schools